Smithwick is a surname. Notable people with the surname include:

Emma Smithwick, English TV producer
Frederick Smithwick (1879–1962), Irish rugby international
Gladys Smithwick (1898–1964), American medical missionary
Hugh Smithwick (1918–1990), American football player and coach
Jan Smithwick (born 1952), Australian basketball player
John Francis Smithwick (1844–1913) Irish businessman and politician
John H. Smithwick (1872–1948), American politician
Noah Smithwick (1808–1899), Texas colonist
Peter Smithwick (1937–2022), Irish judge